Cristina Mendes da Silva (born 1966) is a Portuguese politician. As a member of the Portuguese Socialist Party (PS), she has been a deputy in the Portuguese Assembly of the Republic since 2019, representing the Porto District.

Early life and education
Cristina Maria Mendes da Silva was born on 23 August 1966 in the parish of São Nicolau in Portugal's second city of Porto. Her family came from the parish of Meinedo in the municipality of Lousada, where she still lives. She was trained as a kindergarten teacher in Penafiel and Fafe, specializing in Special Education and Educational Support. Later, she was a PhD student in Human Geography at the Faculty of Arts of the University of Porto. 

Silva has worked in Funchal, Madeira, in Lousada, and in Amarante. She has been president of the national Comissões de Proteção de Crianças e Jovens (Committees for the Protection of Children and Young People - CPCJ) and vice-president of the Associação de Desenvolvimento Rural das Terras do Sousa (Sousa Development Association – ADER-SOUSA), an area in northern Portugal.

Political career
Silva served as councillor in Lousada City Council and, from October 2017, was vice-president. As a member of the Socialist Party (PS), Silva was elected as a deputy in the Assembly of the Republic in the 2019 national election, representing the Porto District. In her first term in the Assembly, she was a member of the parliamentary committees on Labour and Social Security and on European Affairs. In the January 2022 election she was ninth on the PS list of candidates for the Porto District and was easily elected as the PS won 19 seats in Porto and had an overall majority nationally.

References

External link
Interview with Silva

1966 births
Living people
People from Porto
Socialist Party (Portugal) politicians
Members of the Assembly of the Republic (Portugal)
Women members of the Assembly of the Republic (Portugal)
Portuguese educators